Laram Q'awa (Aymara larama blue, q'awa little river, ditch, crevice, fissure, gap in the earth, "blue brook" or "blue ravine", also spelled Laramkahua)  is a  mountain in the Andes of Bolivia. It is situated in the La Paz Department, José Manuel Pando Province, Catacora Municipality. Laram Q'awa lies north-west of the mountains Apachita and Wila Qullu and north-east of Chuqiwa Qullu (Chuquivakkollu).

References 

Mountains of La Paz Department (Bolivia)